Hukeng  is a town (a township-level division) situated in Yongding County, Longyan, Fujian, China.

Hukeng town contains one of the Hakka settlements in China. Moreover, a large number of Fujian Tulou are located with the territory administratively included within Hukeng, with a few within the actual Hukeng Town area. In particular, administratively, Hukeng includes the valley of the Nanxi (南溪,  "South Creek"), where several villages (Yangduo, Xinnan, Nanzhong, Nanjiang, Shijia) consisting mostly of tulou form what some writers have dubbed the "Nanxi Great Wall of Tulou".

See also
List of township-level divisions of Fujian

References

Township-level divisions of Fujian
Longyan